Gamasellus orientalis is a species of mite in the family Ologamasidae.

References

orientalis
Articles created by Qbugbot
Animals described in 1982